Attock Fort was built at Attock Khurd during the reign of Akbar from 1581 to 1583 under the supervision of Khawaja Shamsuddin Khawafi to protect the passage of the River Indus. Attock was briefly captured on 28 April 1758 by the Maratha Empire and became the northern boundary of the Maratha Empire. Ahmad Shah Durrani recaptured Attock and halted the Maratha advance in the north permanently after the Third Battle of Panipat. It featured a prominent role in Afghan-Sikh Wars during the Battle of Attock.

History 
The fort was constructed in 1581 on the orders of the Mughal Emperor Akbar. Construction was completed in two years after which the fort was used as a key defense line against Afghan invaders. The fort was captured in 1758 by Raghunath Rao, Sidhojiraje, Sabaji Shinde Gharge-Desai-Shinde (Deshmukh) and Marathas. The fort was captured in 1812 by Sikhs and the British took over the fort later. After the Partition of India, Pakistan Army took control of the fort. It became headquarters of the 7th division of Pakistan Army. In 1956, the fort was handed over to the Special Services Group (SSG), a special operations force of the Pak Army. Today the fort remains in control of the SSG.

Location 
It is sandwiched between Peshawar Road on one side and the River Indus on the other. It is located at a distance of 80km from the capital city of Islamabad. As its a military base, visitors are not allowed inside the fort.

Features 
The fort consists of 4 gates and its parameter wall is 1600m long. The gates are named the Delhi gate, Lahori Gate, Kabuli Gate and Mori Gate.

See also

List of UNESCO World Heritage Sites in Pakistan
List of forts in Pakistan
List of museums in Pakistan

References

Forts in Punjab, Pakistan
Attock District